Arthur Barry Magee  (born 6 February 1934) is a retired New Zealand long-distance runner. He won a bronze medal in the marathon at the 1960 Olympics and in the 10,000 m event placed 26th at the 1960 and 23rd at the 1964 games.

Biography
Magee was one of the large group of athletes that New Zealand coach Arthur Lydiard used to revolutionise how the world trained for all sports. At the 1960 Olympic Games Lydiard's pupils and Magee's training partners, Murray Halberg and Peter Snell won gold medals over 5000 m and 800 m within one hour. Magee's bronze in the marathon confirmed Lydiard's training methods. He went on to win many major international races, including the 1960 Fukuoka Marathon. But Magee was much more than a marathon runner; he also ran the world's third fastest time over 3 miles and fifth fastest 5000 m at that time. He also recorded the world's fastest 10,000 m and 2nd fastest 5000 m for 1961 and was part of New Zealand's 4 × 1 mile world record breaking relay team in 1961.

Magee always attributed his success to Lydiard, who had become something of a father figure after Magee's own father died in the same year that Lydiard started coaching him. After retiring from international competition Magee coached several top runners himself and currently has a number of high achieving athletes under his wing, including former New Zealand cross country and mountain running champion Jonathan Jackson, and Lachlan Haitana, winner of the 2019 Huntly Half Marathon. Furthermore, many of his former athletes give him praise - referencing much of their success to the training that took place under his guidance at the BCG (Barry's Cricket Ground), Waitakeres (OTT/22 miler), and Lynfield (Lydiard's Hill Spring circuit).

In the 2002 Queen's Birthday and Golden Jubilee Honours, Magee was appointed a Member of the New Zealand Order of Merit, for services to sport.

Honorific eponym
Magee Place, in the Hamilton suburb of Chartwell, is named in Magee's honour.

Quotes

“Anyone can run 20 miles. It's the next six that count.”
“Speed kills, distance doesn't”
“Train don't strain”
“Hills are the shortcut to success”
“There are horses for courses”
“The backstraight is where boys become men”
“The body can only do what the body is regularly accustomed to doing”
Here's one of Barry's favourites and it's one of his twelve commandments: "Go straight to bed after training when you're sick"

References

External links

 Biography at New Zealand Olympic Committee website
 Barry Magee's School of Running
 Tips from Barry Magee

1934 births
Living people
New Zealand male long-distance runners
New Zealand athletics coaches
Olympic bronze medalists for New Zealand
Athletes (track and field) at the 1960 Summer Olympics
Athletes (track and field) at the 1964 Summer Olympics
Olympic athletes of New Zealand
Sportspeople from New Plymouth
Members of the New Zealand Order of Merit
Medalists at the 1960 Summer Olympics
Olympic bronze medalists in athletics (track and field)
Athletes (track and field) at the 1958 British Empire and Commonwealth Games
Athletes (track and field) at the 1962 British Empire and Commonwealth Games
Commonwealth Games competitors for New Zealand